Jean Leete Carson (February 28, 1923 – November 2, 2005) was an American stage, film and television actress best known for her work on the classic 1960s sitcom The Andy Griffith Show as one of the "fun girls".

Early life
Carson was born in Charleston, West Virginia, to Alexander W. Carson and Sadie (née Leete; a descendant of William Leete, first governor of the Colony of Connecticut). She first became interested in show business as a child, playing a "bad little Indian girl". At the age of 12, she got her first acting job, earning $5 for a small part in a production of Carmen that traveled through her hometown. 

In high school she was voted Girl Most Likely to Succeed as an Actress. Carson told her mother she was going to be on Broadway. Before she achieved that goal, she attended Carnegie Mellon University in Pittsburgh, Pennsylvania,

Stage 
Carson's early theatrical work included acting in productions of the Kanawha Players. She made her Broadway debut in George S. Kaufman's Bravo (1958). Her other Broadway work included Anniversary Waltz with Macdonald Carey, Two Blind Mice with Melvyn Douglas, and Bird Cage, which garnered her a Tony Award nomination.

Television 

Carson went on to appear in many pioneering television series, including Studio One, NBC Presents, The Twilight Zone (as Paula in "A Most Unusual Camera", a part written especially for her by Rod Serling) and The Ford Theatre Hour. She continued to make guest starring appearances throughout the 1950s, including Paula in Peter Gunn in 1958 as well as a regular role on 1959's The Betty Hutton Show. (Carson described Hutton as a "foulmouthed old biddy" and said that was the only acting experience she did not enjoy.) 

She played the part of a saloon owner  (Maggie) who takes in an orphan in season 1 episode 9 of the series Sugarfoot in 1958.

On The Andy Griffith show, Carson had a brief role as Naomi in a 1962 episode ("Convicts At Large" with Jane Dulo and Reta Shaw), but her most popular role was Daphne, one of the "fun girls", who appeared with Joyce Jameson on a recurring basis from 1962 to 1965. Daphne was a notorious flirt who greeted her objects of affection with a throaty "Hello Doll".

In February 1964, she had a featured role as a nosy neighbor in "The Case of the Bountiful Beauty", season 7, episode 17 of Perry Mason.

Film 
Carson had roles in films such as 1955's The Phenix City Story and 1958's I Married a Monster from Outer Space. Carson felt she was typecast by some of these roles ("I'm what you call a 'second woman' or 'second tomato.' They never get the man." ).

She earned fourth billing in the 1968 Peter Sellers comedy The Party, perhaps her best-known film.  Her last film role was 1977's Fun with Dick and Jane.

Personal life 
For the first half of the 1970s Carson had a drinking problem which limited her acting career. She retired early in the 1980s, with the exception of mentoring from community theater actors in the Palm Springs area, where she had moved to be close to her children. She later became sober. She was associated with The Andy Griffith Show for many years, attending cast performances, conventions, and other meetings and writing back to fans personally until she suffered a severe stroke which left her incapacitated in September 2005. 

Carson was married to Leonard Smith, Jr., who was the assistant manager of the Roxy Theater.

Death 
On November 2, 2005, Carson died in Palm Springs, California, from complications of a stroke; she was 82 years old. She was survived by two sons.

Filmography

References

External links

 "Hello Doll" - Official website
 
 
 
 2003 Jean Carson interview at Christian Activities

1923 births
2005 deaths
American film actresses
American stage actresses
American television actresses
Carnegie Mellon University College of Fine Arts alumni
Actors from Charleston, West Virginia
Actresses from Los Angeles
Actresses from Palm Springs, California
Actresses from West Virginia
20th-century American actresses